The United States Junior Curling Championships are annual national curling championships for men and women under the age of 21. The championships act as a qualifier for the World Junior Curling Championships. Teams qualify to compete in the national junior championships through winning qualifying events.  The US Junior National Curling Championships are one of the 12 Championship Events of USA Curling.

Past champions

Men

Women

References

Notes

External links
Men's winners
Women's winners

Curling competitions in the United States
Curling
National youth sports competitions
Recurring sporting events established in 1975